Sunday Independent may refer to:
The Independent (Perth)
Sunday Independent (South Africa)
Sunday Independent (England), in south-west England, UK
Sunday Independent (Ireland), in Ireland

See also
The Independent on Sunday, a national newspaper in the UK